In North America, sherbet, often referred to as sherbert in the United States, is a frozen dessert made from sugar-sweetened water, a dairy product such as cream or milk, and a flavoring – typically fruit juice, fruit purée, wine, liqueur and occasionally non-fruit flavors such as vanilla, chocolate, or spice like peppermint. It is similar to, but distinct from sorbet, with the addition of dairy typically being the key differentiator.

Rainbow sherbet is a presentation of sherbet where three flavors, each of a different color, are combined in one package, with the typical colors being green, magenta, and orange.

Preparation 
Commercially produced sherbet in the United States is defined in the Code of Federal Regulations as a frozen product containing one or more optional dairy products.

In Canada, sherbet is defined as a "frozen food, other than ice cream or ice milk, made from a milk product". A typical Canadian sherbet may contain water, a sweetening agent, fruit or fruit juice, citric or tartaric acids, flavouring preparation, food coloring, sequestering agent(s), and lactose.

Homemade sherbets do not always contain dairy. Early 20th-century American recipes for sherbet include some versions made with water. The American Kitchen Magazine from 1902 distinguishes "water ices" from sherbets, explaining that "sherbets are water ices frozen more rapidly, and egg white or gelatin is often added to give a creamy consistency". In one recipe for pineapple sherbet, water may be used in place of milk. It also separately discusses "milk sherbets".

According to The American Produce Review (1913), "Sherbet is a frozen product made from water or milk, egg whites, sugar, lemon juice and flavoring material". Sherbets are made from a base of "plain ice" which is water, sugar, egg whites, and lemon juice.

North American sherbet
Sherbet is distinct from sorbet in Canada and the United States, the term usually connoting a product made with dairy and/or other additives for a creamier, more "ice cream-like" texture.

Commercially produced sherbet in the United States is defined in the Code of Federal Regulations as a frozen product containing one or more optional dairy products. Sorbet, on the other hand, is made with sweetened ice and no dairy; it is similar to Italian ice, but made with real fruit instead of imitation flavoring.

See also

 Sorbet

References

Frozen desserts